A dark horse is a political candidate who is nominated unexpectedly; or an underdog in other fields who achieved unprecedented success.

Dark Horse, Darkhorse, or The Dark Horse may also refer to:

Books 
 Dark Horse Comics, a comic book publisher
 Dark Horse (Brown novel), a 2013 crime novel by Honey Brown
 Dark Horse (Reed novel), a 2008 novel by Ralph Reed
 Dark Horse (Knebel novel), a 1972 novel by Fletcher Knebel
 Dark Horse, a 2002 novel by Tami Hoag
 Dark Horse, a 2018 non-fiction psychology/self-help book by Todd Rose and Ogi Ogas
 The Dark Horse (novel), a 2002 children's novel by Marcus Sedgwick
 The Dark Horse (magazine), a magazine published in Scotland
 The Dark Horse, a 1931 novel by Robert Grant
 The Dark Horse, a 2010 Walt Longmire mystery by Craig Johnson

Film and television

Films
 The Dark Horse (1932 film), an American comedy film
 The Dark Horse (1946 film), an American film directed by Will Jason
 Dark Horse (1992 film), an American film directed by David Hemmings
 Dark Horse (2005 film), a Danish-Icelandic film directed by Dagur Kári
 Dark Horse (2011 film), an American film directed by Todd Solondz
 The Dark Horse (2014 film), a New Zealand film directed by James Napier Robertson
 Dark Horse: The Incredible True Story of Dream Alliance, a 2015 documentary about the racehorse

Television
 "The Dark Horse" (Tanner '88), an episode of the television series Tanner '88

Companies
 Dark Horse Entertainment, a film and TV production arm of Dark Horse Comics (see above)
 Dark Horse, an Australian film production company owned by filmmaker Catriona McKenzie

Music 
 Dark Horse Records, a record label owned by George Harrison

Albums 
 Dark Horse (George Harrison album), 1974
 Darkhorse, by Crazy Town, 2002
 The Dark Horse (Achilles album) or the title song, 2005
 Dark Horse – A Live Collection, by Ryan Star, 2006
 Dark Horse (Nickelback album), 2008
 Dark Horse (Twista album) or the title song, 2014
 Dark Horse (Devin Dawson album) or the title song, 2018
 Dark Horse, by Caitlin & Will, unreleased

Songs 
 "Dark Horse" (George Harrison song), 1974
 "Dark Horse" (Amanda Marshall song), 1997
 "Dark Horse", by Converge from Axe to Fall, 2009
 "Dark Horse", by the Ghost Inside from Get What You Give, 2012
 "Dark Horse" (Katy Perry song), 2013
 "The Dark Horse", by Scale the Summit from The Migration, 2013

Concert tours
 Alternative name for George Harrison and Ravi Shankar's 1974 North American tour
 Dark Horse Tour, 2008–2010 world tour by Nickelback

Other uses 
Operation Darkhorse offensive against the Bangsamoro Islamic Freedom Fighters (BIFF)
Darkhorse Theater Nashville, Tennessee
Darkhorse (band) 
 Dark Horse (astronomy), a large dark nebula
 Dark Horse Brewery, a brewpub in Marshall, Michigan, U.S.
 3rd Battalion, 5th Marines, nicknamed "Dark Horse", an infantry battalion in the U.S. Marine Corps
 Dark Horse, a hybrid 3D computer proposed by Los Alamos National Laboratory prior to the IBM Roadrunner
 DarkHorse Podcast, a podcast presented by Bret Weinstein and Heather Heying

See also
 Dark Horses (disambiguation)